The 2003 North Queensland Cowboys season was the 9th in the club's history. Coached by Graham Murray and captained by Paul Bowman, they competed in the NRL's 2003 Telstra Premiership. Although the club once again finished 11th, they recorded their highest number of wins (10) and competition points (24) in a season.

Season summary 
The rebuild continued for the Cowboys heading into the 2003 season, with 12 players leaving the club. Their key signings included premiership-winning back rower Kevin Campion, New Zealand international prop Paul Rauhihi and journeyman utility David Myles. All three would eventually help the club to their first finals appearance a year later.

Following a solid end to the 2002 season, the new year started brightly for the club, as they won six games from the first 12 rounds to sit inside the Top 8. They picked up three straights win from Rounds 10-12, their first three-game winning streak since 1998. A mid-season slump would soon follow, with eight losses from their next nine fixtures.

The season ended strongly once again, with three wins from their final four games to secure a second consecutive 11th place finish, four competition points outside the Top 8. During the season Matt Sing became the first Cowboy to represent Australia, when selected for their July Test match against New Zealand.

Milestones 
 Round 1: Kevin Campion, Paul McNicholas, David Myles and Paul Rauhihi made their debuts for the club.
 Round 2: Brenton Bowen made his NRL debut.
 Round 6: Neil Sweeney made his debut for the club.
 Round 13: Jason Barsley made his NRL debut.
 Round 13: John Buttigieg played his 100th game for the club.
 Round 14: Matthew Bowen played his 50th game for the club.
 Round 15: Aaron Morgan made his NRL debut.
 Round 18: Daniel Sorbello made his NRL debut.
 Round 19: Micheal Luck played his 50th game for the club.
 Round 22: Jacob Lillyman made his NRL debut.
 Round 22: Daniel Strickland played his 50th game for the club.
 Round 23: Shane Muspratt played his 50th game for the club.

Squad List

Squad Movement

2003 Gains

2003 Losses

Ladder

Fixtures

Regular season

Statistics 

Source:

Representatives 
The following players played a representative match in 2003.

Honours

Club 
 Player of the Year: Paul Rauhihi
 Players' Player: Matt Sing
 Club Person of the Year: Ty Williams

Feeder Clubs

Queensland Cup 
  North Queensland Young Guns - 7th, missed finals

References 

North Queensland Cowboys seasons
North Queensland Cowboys season